Abū Isḥāq Ibrāhīm al-Kānemī (died c. 1212) was an Arab poet and grammarian from Kanem. He was the first to write in Arabic in the central Sudan.

Ibrāhīm was born in the oasis of Bilma, then a part of Kanem. In one poem, he refers to himself as belonging to the Dhakwān branch of the Banū Sulaym. The Dhakwān moved from Upper Egypt to North Africa in the 11th century. He is described as "jet-black in hue", indicating that his mother at least was a Black African. He was educated in the Sudan; in Ghana, according to Ibn Ḥamuwayh.

Ibrāhīm visited Marrakesh around 1197–98, gaining there a reputation as a grammarian and poet. Only fragments of eight of his works survive, mainly quotations in the works of Ibn al-Abbār and Ibn al-Shaʿār. A poem in which he explains why he eschewed satire and wrote mostly qaṣīdas is quoted by both. He was patronized by the Almohad Caliph Yaʿqūb al-Manṣūr (1184–1199). Two lines of a poem Ibrāhīm recited before his patron are quoted by the 19th-century historian Aḥmad al-Nāṣirī al-Salāwī. Ibrāhīm wrote panegyrics on other leading Almohad figures and was a friend of fellow panegyrist ʿAbd al-Raḥmān Fāzāzī, who praised his verses. He also wrote in defence of his dark skin and exchanged stanzas on his race with al-Jirāwī. In Marrakesh, he married a white woman named Zahrāʾ and wrote her poetry dealing with his dark skin.

Ibrāhīm eventually moved to al-Andalus (Spain). He resided in Seville. He died in Spain in AH 608 or 609 (between AD 1211 and 1213).

Notes

Bibliography

External links
Natty Mark Samuels (2015), Ibrahim al-Kanemi, Muslim Heritage (Foundation for Science, Technology and Civilisation, UK).

12th-century births
1210s deaths
Arab people of African descent
Kanem Empire
12th-century Arabs
Medieval grammarians of Arabic
Almohad poets
12th-century Arabic poets
Banu Sulaym